Congham is a village and civil parish in the English county of Norfolk.

History
Congham's name is of Anglo-Saxon origin and derives from the Old English for a farmstead or homestead built upon a mound.

In the Domesday Book of 1086, Congham is recorded as a settlement of 54 households located in the hundred of Freebridge. The village was divided between the estates of William de Warenne and Berner the Bowman.

Congham Oil Mill was built in the village in 1797 and was used to process whale carcasses into oils and other products. The whales were brought to Congham from King's Lynn.

In 1973, remains of a Roman villa were discovered close to Congham. Several artefacts were recovered from the site and are now exhibited in King's Lynn Museum.

Geography
According to the 2011 Census, Congham is a settlement of 241 residents living in 116 households.

Congham falls within the constituency of North West Norfolk and is represented at Parliament by James Wild MP of the Conservative Party.

The River Cong rises close to the village and joins the River Babingley close to Hillington.

From the late 19th century, the Congham area was served by the Lynn & Fakenham Railway, later part of the Midland and Great Northern Joint Railway. A railway bridge at Congham was designed by the M&GNJR engineer William Marriott, pioneering an innovative system of reinforced concrete components and blockwork. In 2021, National Highways infilled the bridge with hundreds of tonnes of aggregate and concrete, but without planning permission. The railway route had been identified as part of a proposed footpath and cycleway between King’s Lynn and Fakenham, and in January 2023 King's Lynn and West Norfolk Borough Council demanded that National Highways submit a retrospective planning application.

St. Andrew's Church
Congham's parish church is of Norman origin and dedicated to Saint Andrew. St Andrew's features a 13th-century example of a font made from Purbeck Marble.

Notable residents
 Robert Elwes - English painter and traveller
 Sir Henry Spelman - English antiquarian 
 Henry Spelman - English soldier, colonist and abductor of Pocahontas
 Sir John Spelman - English historian and politician

War memorial
Congham's war memorial takes the form of a paper Roll of Honour located in St. Andrew's Church. It lists the following names for the First World War:
 Second-Lieutenant William R. C. Ffolkes (1898-1917), 1st Battalion, King's Royal Rifle Corps
 Able-Seaman Richard Smith (d.1917), 6th (Howe) Battalion, Royal Naval Division
 Gunner William Goodburn (d.1917), 76th Brigade, Royal Field Artillery
 Private Horace Rallison (1897-1917), 8th Battalion, Middlesex Regiment
 Private Thomas A. Harper (1875-1917), 1/5th Battalion, Royal Norfolk Regiment
 Private Edward Smith (1890-1917), 7th Battalion, Royal Norfolk Regiment
 Herbert Coomber
 E. H. Griff
 Fred Smith

And the following for the Second World War:
 Major John H. Elwes (1906-1940), 2nd Battalion, Royal Norfolk Regiment
 Leading-Seaman Stanley R. Mason (1911-1942), HMS Arethusa
 Private Wilfred Utteridge (1915-1941), 8th Battalion, Royal Norfolk Regiment

References

External links

 
Villages in Norfolk
King's Lynn and West Norfolk
Civil parishes in Norfolk